Variety seeking or variety-seeking buying behavior describes a consumer's desire to search for alternative products even if she or he is satisfied with a current product.

Selected bibliography
Simonson, Itamar. "The effect of purchase quantity and timing on variety-seeking behavior." Journal of Marketing Research (1990): 150-162.
McAlister, Leigh, and Edgar Pessemier. "Variety seeking behavior: An interdisciplinary review." Journal of Consumer research 9, no. 3 (1982): 311-322.
Kahn, Barbara E., and Alice M. Isen. "The influence of positive affect on variety seeking among safe, enjoyable products." Journal of Consumer Research 20, no. 2 (1993): 257-270.
Van Trijp, Hans CM, Wayne D. Hoyer, and J. Jeffrey Inman. "Why switch? Product category: level explanations for true variety-seeking behavior." Journal of Marketing Research (1996): 281-292.
McAlister, Leigh. "A dynamic attribute satiation model of variety-seeking behavior." Journal of Consumer Research 9, no. 2 (1982): 141-150.
Van Trijp, Hans CM, and Jan-Benedict EM Steenkamp. "Consumers' variety seeking tendency with respect to foods: measurement and managerial implications." European Review of Agricultural Economics 19, no. 2 (1992): 181-195.

See also
Consumer Innovativeness

References

External links
Ecommerce Marketing
Best On Budget Website

Marketing research
Personality traits
Consumer behaviour